Belle K. Maniates (September 1861 – November 13, 1931) was an American novelist and short story writer. At least three silent films were made based on works by Maniates:  Amarilly of Clothes-Line Alley (1918), Mirandy Smiles (1918), and Penny of Top Hill Trail (1921).

Early life 
Belle Kanaris Maniates was born in Marshall, Michigan, in 1861. Her father Nicholas Kanaris Maniates was a Greek immigrant and a doctor. Her mother was Martha Arabelle Becker Maniates, of New York. Her father died in the same year that Belle Maniates was born. She was sometimes described as the niece or grandniece of Greek politician Konstantinos Kanaris.

Career 
Maniates, who worked as a secretary and clerk in the Michigan state government in Lansing, wrote "eight novels and hundreds of short stories". Several of her short stories appeared in the Chicago Defender newspaper. Books by Maniates included David Dunne, a Romance of the Middle West (1912), Amarilly of Clothes-Line Alley (1915), Mildew Manse (1916), Amarilly in Love (1917), Little Boy Bear (1917), Our Next Door Neighbors (1917), Penny of Top Hill Trail (1919), and Sand Holler (1920).

Three of her stories were adapted as silent films: Amarilly of Clothes-Line Alley (1918) was directed by Marshall Neilan, adapted by Frances Marion and starred Mary Pickford; Mirandy Smiles (1918) was directed by William C. deMille, adapted by Edith M. Kennedy, and starred Vivian Martin; and Penny of Top Hill Trail (1921) was directed by Arthur Berthelet, adapted by Finis Fox and Beatrice Van, and starred Bessie Love. Amarilly of Clothes-Line Alley and Mildew Alley were also adapted for the stage, in 1917 and 1922.

Personal life 
Maniates died in Lansing in 1931, aged 70 years.

References

External links

Stories by Maniates 
 Belle K. Maniates, "Angela's Romance", The Pacific Monthly 15(June 1905): 371-376. A short story by Maniates.
 Belle K. Maniates, "A Vegetarian Adventure" The New England Magazine 35(September 1906): 60-65. A short story by Maniates.
 Belle K. Maniates, "Polly's Masquerade" Locomotive Engineers Journal 41(June 1907): 457-460. A short story by Maniates.
 Belle K. Maniates, "An Unsolved Problem" The Black Cat 13(March 1908): 43-52. A short story by Maniates.

1861 births
1931 deaths
20th-century American women writers
People from Marshall, Michigan
American people of Greek descent
20th-century American short story writers